Notre Dame D'Afrique, a Roman Catholic church, is situated in Bangui in the Central African Republic (CAR). It is 5km away from the city center in the largest and popular neighborhood known as KM5.

References

Churches in Bangui
Roman Catholic churches in the Central African Republic